China competed at the 2019 World Championships in Athletics in Doha, Qatar, from 27 September to 6 October 2019. A total of 69 athletes from China participated.

Medallists 
The following competitors from China won medals at the Championships.

Results

Men
Track and road events

Field events

Women
Track and road events

Field events

References

External links
Doha｜WCH 19｜World Athletics

Nations at the 2019 World Athletics Championships
China at the World Championships in Athletics
2019 in Chinese sport